Felipe de Oliveira Egídio (born 21 May 1998) is a Brazilian footballer currently playing as a forward for Viktoria Žižkov.

Career statistics

Club
.

Notes

References

1998 births
Living people
Brazilian footballers
Brazilian expatriate footballers
Association football forwards
Czech National Football League players
Ituano FC players
Mirassol Futebol Clube players
FK Viktoria Žižkov players
Brazilian expatriate sportspeople in the Czech Republic
Expatriate footballers in the Czech Republic